The 1989 Virginia Slims of Dallas was a women's tennis tournament played on indoor carpet courts at the Moody Coliseum in Dallas, Texas in the United States and was part of the Category 4 tier of the 1989 WTA Tour. It was the 19th edition of the tournament and ran from September 18 through September 24, 1989. First-seeded Martina Navratilova won the singles title and earned $50,000 first-prize money.

Finals

Singles
 Martina Navratilova defeated  Monica Seles 7–6(7–2), 6–3
 It was Navratilova's 7th singles title of the year and the 145th of her career.

Doubles
 Mary Joe Fernández /  Betsy Nagelsen defeated  Elise Burgin /  Rosalyn Fairbank 7–6(7–5), 6–3

References

External links
 ITF tournament edition details
 Tournament draws

Virginia Slims of Dallas
Virginia Slims of Dallas
Virginia
Virginia
Virginia Slims of Dallas
Virginia Slims of Dallas